Ban Na Satang  is a village within Na Tan Subdistrict, Na Tan District, Ubon Ratchathani Province, Thailand. Located in the north east of Thailand it is set in typical Thai Isaan surroundings of rice paddies Na Satang has approximately 200 inhabitants.  Na Satang is a rural village and dependent on neighboring Na Tan and Khemarat municipalities. Ubon Ratchathani city plays a major role as commercial center in the region.  Na Satang is heavily dependent of its agriculture and the produce is mainly rice farming of the types kao sway (jasmin rice) and kao niao (sticky rice).

Populated places in Ubon Ratchathani province